Cowden Clarke is a surname. Notable people with the surname include:
 Charles Cowden Clarke (1787–1877), English author
 Mary Cowden Clarke (1809–1898), English author

Compound surnames